Lynette Yiadom-Boakye (born 1977) is a British painter and writer. She is best known for her portraits of imaginary subjects, or ones derived from found objects, who are painted in muted colors. Her work has contributed to the renaissance in painting the Black figure. Her paintings often are presented in solo exhibitions.

Early life and career
Lynette Yiadom-Boakye was born in London, UK where she currently lives and works. Her parents worked as nurses for the National Health Service after emigrating from Ghana. Yiadom-Boakye attended Central St. Martins College of Art and Design; however, she did not enjoy her time there  and so, moved to Falmouth College of Art where she eventually was awarded her undergraduate degree in 2000. She then completed an MA degree at the Royal Academy Schools in 2003.

In 2010 her work was recognized by Okwui Enwezor. With curator Naomi Beckwith, Okwui Enwezor catalogued her exhibition at Studio Museum in Harlem. She was among those nominated for the Turner prize in 2013. In addition to her artwork, Yiadom-Boakye has taught at the Ruskin School of Art, Oxford University where she is a visiting tutor for their Master in Fine Arts programme. Her influence as a painter was recognized in the 2019 Powerlist and she was subsequently listed among the "top 10" of the most influential people of African or African Caribbean heritage in the UK in 2020.

Work

Artworks 
Yiadom-Boakye's work consists mostly of painted portraits of imaginary Black subjects. Her paintings are predominantly figurative, with raw and muted colors. The characteristic dark palette of her work is known for creating a feeling of stillness that contributes to the timeless nature of her subjects. Her portraits of imaginary individuals feature people reading, lounging, and resting in traditional poses. She brings to the depiction of her subjects contemplative facial expressions and relaxed gestures, making their posture and mood relatable to many viewers. Commentators have attributed some of the acclaim of Yiadom-Boakye's work to this relatability. She strives to keep her subjects from being associated with a particular decade or time. This results in choices such as not painting shoes on her subjects, as footwear often serves as a time stamp. These figures usually rest in front of ambiguous backgrounds, floating inside monochromatic dark hues. These cryptic, but emotional backdrops remind commentators of old masters such as Velasquez and Degas.

Lynette Yiadom-Boakye's style shifted slightly after the opening of her 2017 show "In Lieu of a Louder Love". The show featured a new, warmer colour scheme. Her subjects in this show included more vibrant details such as a checkered linoleum-floor, a bold headwrap and bathing suit, and a yellow, orange, and green background.

Although each portrait only contains one person, the paintings typically are presented in groups that are arranged as if family portraits. With her expressive representations of the human figure, Yiadom-Boakye examines the formal mechanisms of the medium of painting and reveals political and psychological dimensions in her works, which focus on imaginary characters who exist beyond our world in a different time and in an unknown location. She paints figures who are intentionally removed from time and place, and has stated, "People ask me, ‘Who are they, where are they?’ What they should be asking is ‘what' are they?"

The Tate Museum provides an introduction to her work that is extensive, to accompany a major exhibition of her work held from 2 December 2020 to 9 May 2021.

Writing 
For an artist, Yiadom-Boakye is unusual in describing herself as a writer as much as a painter—her short stories and prosy poems frequently appear in her catalogues.

In talks about her work, Lynette Yiadom-Boakye notes that her writing is to her as her painting is, and explains that she "writes the things she doesn't paint and paints all the things she doesn't write". Her paintings are given poetic titles.

Art market 
At a 2019 auction at Phillips in London, Yiadom-Boakye's Leave A Brick Under The Maple (2015), a life-size portrait of a standing man, sold for about $1 million.

Subject for work of others 
Painted in 2017, Kehinde Wiley's Portrait of Lynette Yiadom-Boakye, Jacob Morland of Capplethwaite is displayed in the Yale Center for British Art in New Haven, CT.

A portrait of Yiadom-Boakye by photographer Sal Idriss is held in the collection of the National Portrait Gallery, London.

Exhibitions
Yiadom-Boakye has staged numerous solo exhibitions at museums and galleries internationally. Her solo shows include Any Number of Preoccupations (2010), The Studio Museum in Harlem, New York; Verses After Dusk (2015), Serpentine Galleries, London; A Passion To A Principle (2016), Kunsthalle Basel, Switzerland; Under-Song For a Cipher (2017), New Museum, New York; and Fly In League With The Night (2022-2023), Tate Britain, London.

She has also participated in a number of group shows and exhibitions, including the 55th Venice Biennale (2013), Sharjah Biennial (2015), 58th Venice Biennale (2019), and Afro-Atlantic Histories (2021-2022).

Awards 
Yiadom-Boakye has been widely hailed for her work, winning accolades including The Arts Foundation fellowship for painting (2006) and the Carnegie Prize (2018). She was also nominated for the Turner Prize (2013).

Notable works in public collections 

Nous étions (2007), Studio Museum in Harlem, New York
The Fondness (2010), Nelson-Atkins Museum of Art, Kansas City, Missouri
Tambourine (2010), Nasher Museum of Art, Durham, North Carolina
Skylark (2010), Museum of Modern Art, New York
King for an Hour (2011), Pérez Art Museum Miami
Bracken or Moss (2012), Museum of Contemporary Art, Chicago
10pm Saturday (2012), Tate, London
Siskin (2012), Victoria and Albert Museum, London 
A Few For the Many (2013), Los Angeles County Museum of Art
Appreciation of the Inches (2013), San Francisco Museum of Modern Art
Observer of Spring (2013) Museum of Modern Art, Warsaw
Trapsprung (2013), Seattle Art Museum
Womanology 12 (2014), National Museum of African Art, Smithsonian Institution, Washington, D.C.
A Culmination (2016), Kunstmuseum Basel, Switzerland
8am Cadiz (2017), Baltimore Museum of Art
Medicine at Playtime (2017), Museum of Contemporary Art, Los Angeles
The Much-Vaunted Air (2017), Institute of Contemporary Art, Boston
No Need of Speech (2018), Carnegie Museum of Art, Pittsburgh
Repose 3 (2018), Dallas Museum of Art
Shelves for Dynamite (2018), Minneapolis Institute of Art

References

Further reading 
 Orlando Reade, "Life Outside the Manet Paradise Resort: On the Paintings of Lynette Yiadom-Boakye", The White Review, November 2012.
 Eddie Chambers, "Black British artists who should be better known", The IB Tauris Blog, 7 August 2014.
 (Online version is entitled "Lynette Yiadom-Boakye’s imaginary portraits".)
 

Living people
1977 births
20th-century English women artists
21st-century English women artists
Alumni of Falmouth University
Artists from London
Black British artists
British contemporary painters
English contemporary artists
English people of Ghanaian descent
English women painters